Ien Chi (born June 1, 1991) is a Korean American filmmaker, speaker, and the former Creative Director of Jubilee Media. He is the director of the short film "Tick Tock", which won the Best Picture and Best Director awards at Campus MovieFest 2011, the world's largest student film festival. It is currently the most viewed and highest rated film of Campus MovieFest of all time. The film went viral and collectively has approximately 1.7 million views online and has been featured on Gizmodo and The Guardian, among other publications. Chi has led the team at Jubilee Media to create several YouTube shows such Middle Ground that has collectively gotten over 750 million views online.

References

External links 
 
 
 youtube channel
 "Crippled" film
 "Tick Tock" film

Living people
American people of Korean descent
American filmmakers
1991 births